Crosscurrent may refer to:

 Crosscurrent (Jake Shimabukuro album), 2003
 Crosscurrent (Chase Baird album), 2010
 Crosscurrent (film), a 2016 Chinese drama film

See also 
 Crosscurrents (disambiguation)